The Ryukoku Seahorse football program represents Ryukoku University in college football. Ryukoku is a member of the Kansai Collegiate American Football League.

External links
 

American football in Japan
Sports teams in Kyoto Prefecture
1975 establishments in Japan
American football teams established in 1975